Count Marie Hippolyte Adrien Ludovic d'Ursel (Brussels, 17 November 1850 – 9 December 1937) was a Belgian politician and historian.

Family 
A cadet member of the Ursel family, he was a grandson of Charles-Joseph, 4th Duke d'Ursel. His maternal grandfather was Marie-Hippolyte de Gueulluy, Marquis de Rumigny. He married Georgine de Rouillé (1859–1926), and they had several children.

Career 
For six years he served as a member of the Belgian Chamber of Representatives (1894–1900), and as a member of the Catholic Party he represented Brussels in the Senate from 1905 to 1908.

Count d'Ursel was historian and wrote several works, on family history and Belgium.

The D'Ursel Point is named in his honour.

Affiliations 
President of the Belgian Anti-Slavery Society.
President of the  Royal Belgian Society of Géographics.
Commissioner of the Exposition Internationale d'Anvers, 1894.

Honours 
Officer in the Order of Leopold.
Knight Grand Cross in the Order of Saint Gregory the Great.

Ancestry

See also 

 Ursel family
 Belgian nobility

References

La campagne antiesclavagiste belge racontée par les lettres de Jacques de Dixmuide
Lettres réunis et annot. par Hippolyte d'Ursel.- Jacques de Dixmude, Jules Marie Alphonse (1858–1928) ; d'Ursel, Hippolyte (Editor)/Bruxelles : Goemaere, 1929.

1850 births
1937 deaths
Counts of Belgium
Knights Grand Cross of the Order of St Gregory the Great
Members of the Senate (Belgium)
Members of the Chamber of Representatives (Belgium)
Politicians from Brussels
Hippolyte
Belgian abolitionists